Westchester County, New York, in the United States, contains 40 public school districts, 118 private schools and 14 colleges/universities. According to the 2018 rankings provided by the education website Niche, taking into account public comments, 28 of the top 100 school districts in New York State were located in Westchester County.

Public school districts

Most school district boundaries do not follow municipal boundaries, but the six city school districts in the county have the same boundaries as their cities.

The districts are as follows:

 Ardsley Union Free School District
 Bedford Central School District
 Briarcliff Manor Union Free School District
 Blind Brook-Rye School District
 Bronxville Union Free School District
 Byram Hills Central School District
 Chappaqua Central School District
 Croton Harmon Union Free School District
 Dobbs Ferry Union Free School District
 Eastchester Union Free School District
 Edgemont Union Free School District
 Elmsford Union Free School District
 Greenburgh Central School District
 Harrison Central School District
 Hastings Central School District
 Hendrick Hudson Central School District
 Irvington Union Free School District
 Katonah-Lewisboro Union Free School District
 Lakeland Central School District
 Mamaroneck Union Free School District
 Mount Pleasant Central School District
 Mount Vernon City School District
 The City School District of New Rochelle
 North Salem Central School District
 Ossining Union Free School District
 Peekskill City School District
 Pelham Union Free School District
 Pleasantville Union Free School District
 Pocantico Hills Central School District
 Port Chester Rye Union Free School District
 Rye City School District
 Rye Neck Union Free School District
 Scarsdale Union Free School District
 Somers Central School District
 Tarrytown Union Free School District
 Tuckahoe Union Free School District
 Valhalla Union Free School District
 White Plains Public School District
 Yonkers Public Schools
 Yorktown Central School District

Private schools
High Schools

Archbishop Stepinac High School, White Plains
Blessed Sacrament-St. Gabriel High School, New Rochelle
Daytop Village Secondary School, Hartsdale
French-American School of New York senior high, Scarsdale
German School of New York, White Plains
Hackley School, Tarrytown
Hallen Center, New Rochelle
The Harvey School, Katonah
Iona Preparatory School (Upper School), New Rochelle
John F. Kennedy Catholic High School, Somers
The Karafin School, Inc., Somers
Keio Academy of New York, Purchase
The Leffell School, Hartsdale
Maria Regina High School, Hartsdale
The Masters School, Dobbs Ferry
The Montfort Academy, Mt. Vernon
New York School for the Deaf, White Plains
Rye Country Day School, Rye
Sacred Heart High School, Yonkers
Salesian High School, New Rochelle
School of the Holy Child, Rye
Thornton Donovan School, New Rochelle
The Ursuline School, New Rochelle
Westchester Hebrew High School, Mamaroneck
Yeshiva Farm Settlement School, Mount Kisco
Yeshivath Ohr Hameir, Peekskill

Elementary, Junior High and Special Schools

Academy of Our Lady of Good Counsel, White Plains
Annunciation School, Crestwood
Bedford Christian School, Bedford
Bereshith Cultural School, Mount Vernon
Berjan School, Mamaroneck
Blessed Sacrament Elementary School, New Rochelle (closed)
Cardinal McCloskey School, Ossining
The Caring Place, New Rochelle
The Chapel School, Bronxville
Christ the King School, Yonkers
The Clear View School, Briarcliff Manor
Corpus Christi-Holy Rosary School, Port Chester
Eyes & Ears World, Inc., Yonkers
Ferncliff Manor, Yonkers
French-American School of New York, campuses in Mamaroneck, Larchmont, and Scarsdale 
The Garden Road School, Crompond
German School of New York, White Plains
Hackley School, Tarrytown
Hallen Center, New Rochelle
Harvey School, Katonah
Hawthorne Country Day School, Hawthorne
Holy Name School, New Rochelle
Holy Name of Jesus School, Valhalla
Hudson Country Montessori School, New Rochelle
Immaculate Conception School, Irvington
Immaculate Conception School, Tuckahoe
Immaculate Heart of Mary School, Scarsdale
Immanuel Lutheran School, Mount Vernon
Iona Preparatory School (Lower School), New Rochelle
Jean Grey School for Higher Learning, North Salem
Leake & Watts Children's Home School, Yonkers
The Leffell School, Hartsdale
Martin Luther King Child Development Ctr., New Rochelle
Milestone School, Fleetwood
Mohawk Country Home School, White Plains
Mount Tom Day School, New Rochelle
The Northern Westchester Chinese School, Yorktown
Oakview Prep of SDA, Yonkers
Orchard School - Andrus Child Home, Yonkers
Our Lady of Assumption School, Peekskill
Our Lady of Fatima School, Scarsdale
Our Lady of Mt. Carmel School, Elmsford
Our Lady of Sorrows School, White Plains
Our Lady of Victory School, Mount Vernon
Our Montessori School Yorktown, Heights
Resurrection School, Rye
Ridgeway Nursery School & Kindergarten, White Plains
Rippowam Cisqua School, Bedford
Rye Country Day School, Rye
Sacred Heart, Yonkers
Sacred Heart School, Hartsdale
Sacred Heart / Mt. Carmel School - Arts, Mount Vernon
SS John & Paul School, Larchmont
SS Peter & Paul School, Mount Vernon
St. Ann School, Ossining
St. Anthony School, West Harrison
St. Anthony School, Yonkers
St. Augustine School, Ossining
St. Bartholomew School, Yonkers
St. Casimir School, Yonkers
St. Columbanus School, Cortlandt Manor
St. Eugene School, Yonkers
St. Gregory the Great School, Harrison
St. John the Baptist School, Yonkers
St. Joseph School, Bronxville
St. Joseph's School, Croton Falls
St. Jude Habilitation Institute, Tarrytown
St. Mark Lutheran School, Yonkers
St. Mary School, Yonkers
St. Patrick School, Yorktown Heights
St. Peter School, Yonkers
St. Ursula's Learning Center, Mount Vernon
Transfiguration School, Tarrytown
Transitional Learning Center, New Rochelle
UCP of Westchester, New Rochelle
Westchester Area School, New Rochelle
Westchester Day School, Mamaroneck
Westchester Exceptional Children School, Purdys
Westchester School for Special Children, Yonkers
Yeshiva Day School of Lincoln Park, Yonkers
Yonkers Christian Academy, Yonkers

Colleges, universities and vocational schools

Berkeley College, White Plains, New York
Fordham University, West Harrison, New York
Iona University, New Rochelle, New York
Long Island University, Westchester Graduate Campus, Purchase, New York
Manhattanville College, Purchase, New York
Mercy College, Dobbs Ferry, New York
Monroe College, New Rochelle, New York
New York Medical College, Valhalla, New York
Pace University, Pleasantville, Briarcliff Manor, and White Plains, New York
Purchase College, State University of New York, Purchase, New York
St. Joseph's Seminary, Dunwoodie, Yonkers, New York
Saint Vladimir's Orthodox Theological Seminary, Crestwood, Yonkers, New York
Sarah Lawrence College, Yonkers, New York
Westchester Community College, Valhalla, New York

Weekend supplementary schools
The Japanese Weekend School of New York, a Japanese weekend supplementary school, holds classes at Port Chester Middle School in Port Chester.

Organizations
The Japanese Educational Institute of New York (JEI; ニューヨーク日本人教育審議会 Nyūyōku Nihonjin Kyōiku Shingi Kai), a nonprofit organization that operates two Japanese day schools and two weekend school systems in the New York City area, has its headquarters in Rye.

References

School districts in New York (state)